Sataon was a constituency of the Uttar Pradesh Legislative Assembly in the Indian state of Uttar Pradesh. It ceased to exist in 2012. It was under Raebareli district.

Members of the Legislative Assembly

References 

Raebareli district
Former assembly constituencies of Uttar Pradesh
Constituencies disestablished in 2012
2012 disestablishments in India
Constituencies established in 1967
1967 establishments in Uttar Pradesh